Borj-e Olya (also Romanized as Borj-e ‘Olyā; also known as Borj Bālā and Borj-e Bālā) is a village in Nazarkahrizi Rural District, Nazarkahrizi District, Hashtrud County, East Azerbaijan Province, Iran. At the 2006 census, its population was 94, in 15 families.

References 

Towns and villages in Hashtrud County